Prinsessor (Swedish for "Princesses") is the second studio album by Swedish singer-songwriter Laleh, released on 6 December 2006 on Warner Music Sweden Records. The album wasn't as successful as her debut album, peaking at number three on the Swedish Albums Chart. None of the album's singles managed to break into the charts.

Description
Laleh described the album as following: "The album is called Prinsessor, it is named after a track from the album. There are twelve songs on the album in which one is an instrumental track and another classic, but some tough and some soft. As usual, I have been alone in the studio, which I love. However – after the fantastic experiences me and the band had together on our tours, it was time to invite my favorite little bunch to the studio, and they played on four of the songs.

It feels difficult to resist playing all of the instruments by myself because it's simply so incredibly fun and liberating – but they're so talented, besides, it requires other techniques to record several instruments at the same time, and as a technician it was fun to try it too. It was actually fun to form the music and work in this way as a producer, they understood what I wanted to access, so it worked."

Track listing
All songs written, performed, recorded and produced by Laleh.
 "Det är vi som bestämmer (Vem har lurat alla barnen?)" – 4:12 (It is we who decide [Who fooled all the children?])
 "Mamma" – 3:53 (Mom)
 "Closer" – 2:53
 "Call on Me" – 3:29
 "Prinsessor" – 4:19 (Princesses)
 "November" – 3:48
 "Your Town" – 3:48
 "Step on You" – 3:44
 "I Know This" – 4:11
 "Part Two" – 2:20
 "Far har lärt mig" – 4:38 (Father has taught me)
 "12" – 3:25

Credits

Additional personnel
 Magnus Larsson – bass (on tracks 1, 3, 7, 9)
 Oscar Gezelius – drums (on tracks 1, 3, 7, 9)
 Henrik Ekberg – guitar (on tracks 1, 3, 7, 9)

Production
 Mastering: Henrik Johnson
 Mixing: Henrik Edenhed
 Photography: Laleh, Oscar Gezelius

Charts

Weekly charts

Year-end charts

References

2006 albums
Laleh (singer) albums